The 1894 Kentucky State College Blue and White football team represented Kentucky State College—now known as the University of Kentucky—during the 1894 college football season. Led by W. P. Finney in his first and only season as head coach, the Blue and White compiled a record of 5–2.

Schedule

References

Kentucky State College
Kentucky Wildcats football seasons
Kentucky State College Blue and White football